Paparore is a small coastal settlement near the north of Waipapakauri, adjacent to Rangaunu Harbour. It has a marae and cemetery.

A New Zealand Labour Party branch was formed there in 1936.

Demographics
The SA1 area is part of the larger Rangaunu Harbour statistical area.

The SA1 statistical area had a population of 186 at the 2018 New Zealand census, an increase of 36 people (24.0%) since the 2013 census, and an increase of 48 people (34.8%) since the 2006 census. There were 60 households, comprising 93 males and 90 females, giving a sex ratio of 1.03 males per female. The median age was 40.8 years (compared with 37.4 years nationally), with 42 people (22.6%) aged under 15 years, 30 (16.1%) aged 15 to 29, 84 (45.2%) aged 30 to 64, and 27 (14.5%) aged 65 or older.

Ethnicities were 66.1% European/Pākehā, 71.0% Māori, 1.6% Pacific peoples, 1.6% Asian, and 3.2% other ethnicities. People may identify with more than one ethnicity.

Of those people who chose to answer the census's question about religious affiliation, 35.5% had no religion, 35.5% were Christian, 17.7% had Māori religious beliefs and 1.6% had other religions.

Of those at least 15 years old, 21 (14.6%) people had a bachelor or higher degree, and 36 (25.0%) people had no formal qualifications. The median income was $21,800, compared with $31,800 nationally. 15 people (10.4%) earned over $70,000 compared to 17.2% nationally. The employment status of those at least 15 was that 66 (45.8%) people were employed full-time, 18 (12.5%) were part-time, and 9 (6.2%) were unemployed.

Education
Paparore School is a contributing primary (years 1–6) school. There was a native school in the area in 1915.

References

External links
Paparore School

Far North District
Populated places in the Northland Region